William Stewart (born 11 May 1997) is a British rower. He is the 2022 world champion in the men's coxless four following an earlier gold medal win in the same boat class at the 2022 European Rowing Championships.

References

External links

1997 births
Living people
British male rowers
World Rowing Championships medalists for Great Britain
21st-century British people